Cyanimides are a group of chemical compounds sharing a common functional group with the general structure R1R2N-C≡N. This group can be regarded as a secondary amine with a cyano substituent.

References 

  

Functional groups